A combustion engine is an engine which generates mechanical power by combustion of a fuel. Combustion engines are of two general types: 
 Internal combustion engine
 External combustion engine

an:Motor de combustión
de:Verbrennungsmotor
es:Motor de combustión